Royal tours of Canada by the Canadian royal family have been taking place since 1786, and continue into the 21st century, either as an official tour, a working tour, a vacation, or a period of military service by a member of the royal family. Originally, official tours were events predominantly for Canadians to see and possibly meet members of their Canadian royal family, with the associated patriotic pomp and spectacle. However, nearing the end of the 20th century, such occasions took on the added dimension of a theme; for instance, the 2005 tour of Saskatchewan and Alberta by Queen Elizabeth II and Prince Philip, Duke of Edinburgh, was deemed to be a vehicle for the Queen and Canadians to honour "The Spirit of Nation Builders." The couple's tour in 2010 was themed "Honouring the Canadian Record of Service Past, Present and Future." Official royal tours have always been vested with civic importance, providing a regionalised country with a common thread of loyalty.

The first member of the royal family to visit Canada was the future King William IV, who arrived on the country's east coast in 1786 while an officer in the Royal Navy. His niece, Queen Victoria, never came to Canada, but during her reign, her son, the future King Edward VII, made the first modern Canadian royal tour: partaking in official engagements, meeting politicians and the public, and reviewing troops. There had been many invitations since 1858 for the reigning monarch to tour Canada, but in 1939 King George VI was the first to do so. During that trip, the King's wife, Queen Elizabeth, initiated the tradition of the "royal walkabout", though her brother-in-law, the former King Edward VIII, had often met ordinary Canadian people in 1919; as he said: "Getting off the train to stretch my legs, I would start up conversations with farmers, section hands, miners, small town editors or newly arrived immigrants from Europe."

Royal tours can take more than a year to organize. The planning is coordinated by the Canadian Secretary to the King. The regions to be visited are decided by a rotational formula. Modern tours have run with a theme; for instance the visit of Elizabeth II and the Duke of Edinburgh in 2010 was intended to highlight "the Canadian record of service—past, present and future"; themes are decided upon by the King's secretary together with the Minister of Canadian Heritage and the Office of the Prime Minister.

18th century

1780s
As an officer in the Royal Navy, Prince William Henry (later William IV) was the first member of the Royal Family to visit Newfoundland Colony, the colony of Nova Scotia, and the Province of Quebec (later Lower and Upper Canada). Arriving in Newfoundland, William found himself involved in the civil and naval affairs of Newfoundland, with no permanent civil authorities, and the newly arrived Prince being the senior naval officer in the colony. During his time in Newfoundland, he presided over a court, and commissioned the construction of St. Luke's Anglican Church in Newtown. On 21 August 1786, he celebrated his 21st birthday on his ship in the waters off Newfoundland.

He eventually proceeded to the main base of the Royal Navy's North American Station, based at the Royal Naval Dockyards in Halifax, Nova Scotia. Although he received a royal reception upon his arrival to Halifax, it was later made clear he would receive no further special treatment, not already accorded to an officer of his rank in the Royal Navy. William visited Quebec in 1787, travelling as far inland as Cornwall. While there, he encouraged the United Empire Loyalists to settle the region that later made up Upper Canada. Near Cornwall, he also received a reception from members of the First Nations communities.

Following his visit to Quebec, William was stationed in the West Indies. Depressed over the departure of Horatio Nelson, who he befriended during his time in the Caribbean, he took HMS Pegasus to Halifax, without permission from the Royal Navy. William was ordered to winter in Quebec, although he would take his ship back to Britain, arriving in Portsmouth in December 1787.

He served in North America for another year, stationed in cities including Halifax.

1790s

Prince Edward, Duke of Kent and Strathearn became the second member of the Royal Family to tour the Canadian colonies, and the first to live there for an extended period of time. Stationed at Gibraltar in 1790, he requested to be transferred to the Canadian colonies, in an effort to avoid the extreme Mediterranean heat. Arriving in Quebec City in 1791, he came as the colonel for the 7th Regiment of Foot, a military unit garrisoned in Quebec. Shortly after his arrival, Edward was called upon by the Lord Dorchester, the Governor-in-Chief of the Canadas, as 40 First Nations chiefs travelled to Quebec City to complain about American border incursions. Taking advantage of Edward's princely status, the Governor-in-Chief presented the Prince to First Nations' chiefs proclaiming "Brothers! Here is Prince Edward, son of our king, who has just arrived with a chosen band of his warriors to protect this country," and subsequently named Edward as second-in-command of British forces in the Canadas.

Edward began to tour the Canadas in August 1791, departing from Quebec City to Montreal, Kingston, the Thousand Islands, and Newark-on-the-Lake. Edward returned to Quebec City in time to act as an observer for the election of the first Legislative Assembly of Lower Canada, in Charlesbourg in June 1792. Edward is credited with the first use of the term "Canadian" to mean both French and English settlers in the Canadas. Witnessing a riot breaking out between two groups at the polling station, he entreated the public in French, "I urge you to unanimity and concord. Let me hear no more of the odious distinction of English and French. You are all His Britannick Majesty's beloved Canadian subjects."

With the outbreak of the French Revolutionary War, Edward was promoted to Major-General, and ordered to proceed to the Caribbean in January 1794. As the St. Lawrence River was frozen over for the winter, he was to travel overland to Boston, before boarding a ship bound for Martinique. In doing so, he became the first member of the Royal Family to enter the newly formed United States.

Following the West Indies campaign in the spring of 1794, he sailed for Halifax aboard . Arriving on 10 May 1794, he left the city in June to tour Nova Scotia, and the newly established colony of New Brunswick, visiting Annapolis Royal, and Saint John. He was later made the Commander-in-Chief of the Maritimes. During his time in Nova Scotia, he presided over the expansion of Halifax and improved the city's defences, primarily through his ability to secure funds from London. He also worked to improve communications between the Canadian colonies, creating the first telegraph signal system in North America, and improving mail service between Halifax and Lower Canada. Edward departed for Britain in August 1800, although he formally maintained his position as Commander-in-Chief of the region until 1802. In 1811, Edward sought to obtain the appointment as the Governor General of the Canadas, although failed to do so.

19th century
The 19th century saw the beginning of modern royal tours in the country, with travel becoming easier and faster due to technological innovations such as the steamship, and rail transports. The mid-19th century marked the final time a member of the royal family made a transatlantic crossing by sailing ship; as royal family members began to travel by steamship in the late-19th century. While travelling through Canada, multiple modes of transportation were used when touring within Canada, including rail, on foot, and various-sized water vessels.

1860 royal tour
On 14 May 1859, the Legislative Assembly of the Province of Canada petitioned Queen Victoria, and other members of the royal family to visit Montreal for the opening of Victoria Bridge. Unwilling to leave London in the hands of rivaling politicians, Victoria instead accepted the Canadian invitation on behalf of her son, Albert Edward, the Prince of Wales (later Edward VII). The Prince of Wales undertook a two-month tour of Newfoundland, New Brunswick, Nova Scotia, Prince Edward Island, and the Province of Canada in 1860. The Prince of Wales' royal tour was used as the standard model for future royal tours for the next century.

Newfoundland, and Maritime colonies

The Prince of Wales reached St. John's, Newfoundland, on 24 July 1860, aboard HMS Hero. The welcome reception the Prince of Wales received set the pattern for other welcome receptions during the royal tour, which typically included an official address at a levee, and a formal ball held in the Prince of Wales' honour. During his time there, he attended the St. John's Regatta, and was gifted a Newfoundland dog on behalf of Newfoundlanders.

Travelling from St. John's he arrived in Halifax on 2 August. While in Halifax, he visited the Prince's Lodge, the country home used by his grandfather, the Duke of Kent and Strathearn. From Halifax, the royal party boarded a train and stopped in Windsor, and Hantsport, where they boarded HMS Styx to cross the Bay of Fundy to Saint John. On 4 August, the Prince travelled through the St John River on the steamer Forest Queen to Fredericton. During his time there, he attended a royal reception, and inaugurated a park. Following his visit to Fredericton, he travelled to Pictou, Nova Scotia to board HMS Hero, returning to several communities, including Saint John, and Windsor.

He landed at Charlottetown, Prince Edward Island, on 10 August, where he was welcomed by George Dundas, the Governor of Prince Edward Island, and proceeded to Government House. There, he held audience with the Executive Council of Prince Edward Island. Along with formal ball and levee, the Prince toured the countryside around Charlottetown, and visited Province House, where he received an addresses from the Executive Council. Upon his departure, he left with the Governor £150 for charitable use.

Province of Canada

The Prince of Wales was formally welcomed into the Province of Canada by a Canadian delegation, who came aboard HMS Hero near Percé Rock. The Canadian welcome delegation consisted of the Governor General of the Province of Canada, Edmund Walker Head, and Joint Premiers, George-Étienne Cartier, and John A. Macdonald. Arriving in Quebec City on 17 August, the Prince knighted Narcisse Belleau, Speaker of the Legislative Council, and Henry Smith, Speaker of the Legislative Assembly. During his time there, he also visited Montmorency Falls, and made an address at the Université Laval.

Following his visit to Quebec City, the Prince of Wales proceeded towards Montreal aboard HMS Hero, joined by several members of the Legislative Assembly near Trois-Rivières. Arriving in Montreal, he took a specially-built open railway car to the Victoria Bridge in Pointe-Saint-Charles, and tapped in-place the final-laid stone for the bridge. During his five-day stay in Montreal, he stayed at the viceregal residence Spencerwood, and inaugurated the city's Crystal Palace, recalling the favourable impression made by Canadians at the Great Exhibition in an address to the crowd.

At Ottawa, the Prince laid the foundation stone of the parliament buildings, canoed on the Ottawa River, and rode a timber slide on the Chaudière Falls. Travelling towards Toronto aboard the steamer Kingston, visits were planned for Belleville, and Kingston, although anti-Catholic demonstrators from the Orange Order prevented the Prince from disembarking. In an attempt to not embroil the Prince in a controversy, Henry Pelham-Clinton, the Under-Secretary of State who joined the Prince on his tour, informed mayors that they would not disembark until the demonstrators were dispersed. Sailing further west, the Prince visited Cobourg, Rice Lake, and Peterborough, where he received a reception from the Mississaugas. He then proceeded to Port Hope, re-boarding Kingston to sail on to Toronto.

During a levee in Toronto, the Prince received a delegation from Belleville and Kingston, tending apologies for the early incident. On 10 September, he took a one-day excursion to Collingwood, before returning to Toronto the following day. On his way back, he visited and received addresses from Aurora, Barrie, Bradford, and Newmarket. In Toronto, the Prince attended the Royal Canadian Yacht Club's regatta, agreeing to become its patron; and opened Allan Gardens, and Queen's Park to the public. He departed the city for London, Ontario on 12 September, visiting Guelph and Stratford on the way. From London, he travelled to Sarnia, in order to attend a gathering of 150 First Nations representatives in the Province of Canada. Following this gathering, he briefly returned to London, before travelling by railway to the Niagara Peninsula.

In the peninsula, he visited Brantford, Chippewa, Fort Erie, and Queenston. The Niagara Falls were illuminated for the first time during his tour of the falls. There, he rode on the Maid of the Mist. At Queenston, he met with 160 War of 1812 veterans, dedicated a rebuilt Brock's Monument, and visited Laura Secord. From Queenston, he moved towards Niagara-on-the-Lake, St. Catherines, and Hamilton.
 
Completing his royal tour of the Province of Canada in late-September, the Prince of Wales departed for the United States from Windsor, Ontario. Taking a month-long personal tour of the United States, he travelled under the pseudonym "Lord Renfrew," in an attempt to not attract attention to himself. The Canadian co-premieres saw-off the Prince's during his departure from Canada, and again from the United States, travelling to Portland, Maine, on 20 October 1860 to see the Prince off.

1861–1883
In 1861, Prince Alfred took a five-week tour of The Maritimes, Newfoundland, and the Province of Canada. While escorting Prince Alfred through Canada West, the Governor General of Canada used the opportunity to make sketches of American defences around the Great Lakes.

From 1869 to 1870, Prince Arthur was stationed in Canada as a British Army officer in the Rifle Brigade's Montreal detachment. Arriving in Halifax, he undertook a two-month royal tour of the colony of Prince Edward Island, and the newly formed Dominion of Canada, before returning to military duty in Montreal. In the same year, the Six Nations of the Grand River conferred the title of chief to Prince Arthur. In a formal ceremony, the chief of the three "clans" of the Mohawks received The Prince, and conferred upon him the name "Kavakoudge," meaning "the sun flying from east to west under the guidance of the Great Spirit." Although the title of chief was bestowed as an honorary title to a number of individuals, Arthur underwent the necessary rituals to formalize the title in Mohawk society.

During his time in Canada, Prince Arthur became the first member of the royal family to attend the opening of the Canadian parliament, in February 1870. Prince Arthur, along with his regiment, was present at the Battle of Eccles Hill, a raid conducted by the American-based Fenian Brotherhood, on 25 May 1870. The Prince was awarded the Canada General Service Medal for his participation in the Fenian raids. Returning to the United Kingdom in 1870, Prince Arthur would return to Canada on two more occasions, the latter visit as the Governor General of Canada.

Other members of the royal family were also in Canada as a part of their military service during the late-1870s and early-1880s. Prince Alfred was stationed at Royal Naval Dockyard, Halifax from time to time between 1878 and 1883, as Commander of the Royal Navy's North Atlantic Squadron. Prince George of Wales (later George V) was stationed in the Maritimes in 1882 as a midshipman on HMS Cumberland. During his time there, he drove the last spike into Newfoundland's first railway, the Harbour Grace Railway.

Princess as the viceregal consort (1878–1883)

In 1878, Benjamin Disraeli, the Prime Minister of the United Kingdom, requested the Marquess of Lorne be appointed the next Governor General of Canada, with his wife, Princess Louise, Duchess of Argyll, serving as the viceregal consort of Canada. Disraeli's nomination of Lorne was largely motivated by his desire to see a member of the royal family reside in Canada for an extended period. Prior to his appointment as the Canadian Governor General, Lorne was virtually unknown to the public, with little concrete record of public service. The attraction for appointing Lorne to the office was having his spouse, Princess Louise, reside in Canada. 

Arriving in Canada on 23 November 1878, the viceregal couple was greeted by Prince Alfred, who was serving as a Royal Navy officer, stationed in Halifax. Lorne was formally sworn in as the Governor General in Province House, Halifax, before they proceeded towards the capital, in Ottawa. Arriving in Ottawa on 2 December, the head of the Canadian ministry, John A. Macdonald, was not present at the viceregal welcome reception. Macdonald's absence from the welcome reception was depicted as a purposeful insult to the princess by the opposition Liberal Party. They proceeded to take a private trip to Niagara Falls in January 1879, before returning to Ottawa to open the 4th Canadian Parliament, on 13 February 1879.

They undertook an official tour of Eastern Canada from mid-May 1879, touring Montreal during Victoria Day, awarding prizes to officer cadets of the Royal Military College of Canada in Kingston.  On 9 June, they opened Terrasse Dufferin in Quebec City, and later laid the cornerstone of Porte Kent, gifted to the city from Queen Victoria.  Following their tour of Quebec, they proceeded towards The Maritimes and Ontario. In Toronto, they opened the first Canadian National Exhibition, and attended the Queen's Plate. During their time in Ottawa, both Lorne and Louise worked towards the creation of a national arts association, establishing the Royal Canadian Academy of Arts in 1880.

On 14 February 1880 in Ottawa, Princess Louise was injured after her horse-drawn sleigh was turned over. Hitting her head on the metal frame of the sleigh, Louise suffered from neuralgia after the incident. The public was not made aware of the event, with the aide-de-camp to the Governor General downplaying the incident to the press. She did not make another public appearance until April 1880. While recovering, she was visited by her brother Prince Leopold. Louise and Leopold privately toured Quebec, Ontario, and the American city of Chicago until 31 July 1880, when both returned to the United Kingdom. 

During Lorne's 1881 tour of the Northwest Territories, he proposed a section of the territory take its Alberta after his wife (whose full name was Louise Caroline Alberta). Similarly, Princess Louise was the one who proposed the name for Regina, from the Latin word for Queen.

Louise returned to Canada until 4 June 1882, although rumors of a Fenian plot against her forced her to remain in the Citadelle of Quebec, a military installation used by the Canadian militia, and the secondary residence for the Monarch, and the Governor General. On 30 August, Lorne and Louise set out for an official tour of British Columbia, visiting Victoria, and meeting with a First Nations delegation in New Westminster. Louise remained in Victoria as Lorne continued with the official tour into the British Columbia Interior. They remained in the province until 7 December 1882, with their tour extended to counter secessionist sentiments in the province, a result of the federal government's failure to produce a transcontinental rail link by 1881. Robert Beaven, the Premier of British Columbia was said to have suggested the province secede from Canada, and establish an independent kingdom with Louise as its Queen. The resulting crisis had spurred Lorne to push the Canadian government to hasten the development of the Canadian Pacific Railway.

Louise was visited by another member of the royal family, Prince George of Wales, in April 1883. Shortly before the end of his fifth year as Governor General, Lorne declined an option to serve the position for another year. His decision to turn down an additional year in office was questioned by some, with Queen Victoria suspecting that Lorne was jealous of Louise's popularity with Canadians, in contrast to his own. The Marquess and Princess Louise concluded their term in Canada with a farewell tours in Montreal, and Toronto, leaving for the United Kingdom from Quebec City on 27 October 1883.

1884–1900
In 1890, Prince Arthur conducted another tour of Canada, arriving in British Columbia from his earlier service with the British Army in the British Raj. During this tour, he travelled east towards the Maritimes, primarily by railway, before continuing on to the United Kingdom.

Princess Marie Louise arrived in Canada in 1900 to tour the country, however controversy surrounding her spouse, Prince Aribert of Anhalt forced her to return to the United Kingdom shortly after her arrival. After Prince Aribert was found in bed with another man, his father, Frederick I, Duke of Anhalt, accused Marie Louise of indecency, claiming that his son was denied his conjugal rights. Marie Louise was at Rideau Hall when the Governor General gave her two telegrams instructing her to return to the United Kingdom immediately. Her marriage with Prince Aribert was annulled in December 1900, with his father using his prerogative as a reigning Duke of Anhalt to annul the marriage.

Early 20th century (1901–1950)

1900s

1901 royal tour

The first royal tour after the death of Queen Victoria was conducted by the second son of the reigning king, Prince George, Duke of Cornwall and York (later George V), his spouse, Mary, Duchess of Cornwall and York (later Queen Mary), and the Duchess's brother, Prince Alexander of Teck (later the Earl of Athlone). The tour in Canada formed a part of a larger eight-month royal tour of the British Empire that began on 16 March 1901, with the Duke and Duchess's departure from Portsmouth, United Kingdom.

The Canadian portion of the tour was originally planned to begin in British Columbia, proceeding eastward through the country. However, after South Africa was added onto the royal tour, the decision was made to begin to the royal tour in Quebec City, and conclude it in Halifax. As the period of court mourning for Queen Victoria's death had not yet expired during their time in Canada, public balls, banquets, and levees planned for the royal tour were cancelled, with only official dinners, concerts, receptions, and reviews taking place. During the tour, Prince George kept a methodical record of his activities, recording that he shook the hands of 24,855 people at official receptions; received 544 addresses; laid 21 cornerstones; gave 100 speeches; and presented 4,329 medals.

The Canadian portion of the 1901 royal tour began 16 September 1901, when the  arrived in Quebec City. The royal partywhich consisted of 22 people, landed at Quebec City on 16 September. During his time in Quebec City, Prince George invested Lieutenant Richard Ernest William Turner with the Victoria Cross for his conduct during the Battle of Leliefontein in a ceremony at the Plains of Abraham, and spoke to students at the Université Laval. Moving west of Quebec City by railway, the group made stops to Montreal, and Ottawa. Throughout the royal tour, Prince George placed an emphasis on praising the creation and expansion of the country during his own lifetime, giving a speech about the country's development and growth in Ottawa and Winnipeg.

In Ottawa, Prince George dedicated the Alexandra Bridge in Ottawa, rode a timber slide, and watched the lacrosse final for the Minto Cup, a match he enjoyed so much he kept the ball that was used. Departing from Ottawa, they passed through Ontario, creating "incredible excitement seldom seen since the visit of his father in 1860." The Duke and Duchess arrived in Manitoba where the former opened the new science building at the University of Manitoba, and then to Regina in the North-West Territories. In Calgary, they met with First Nations chiefs and viewed exhibitions, before concluding their western-leg of their tour in Vancouver and Victoria. They group then turned back again towards Banff, where the Duchess went to Tunnel Mountain and Lake Louise, while the Duke went to Poplar Point.

After passing back through Regina, they reunited in Toronto, welcomed by the Toronto Mendelssohn Choir, and attended concerts at Massey Hall. They proceeded to tour throughout Southern Ontario, before returning to Montreal, where the Duke opened the newly rebuilt Victoria Bridge. The Canadian tour ended with a trip through Saint John, and their departure from Halifax. Following their departure from Halifax, the global royal tour proceeded towards Newfoundland, a separate colony not associated with Canada at the time. In Newfoundland, they received nine-month old Newfoundland dog, which was later given their son, Prince Edward (later Edward VIII).

Tercentenary of Quebec City (1908)

In 1908 the Canadian government asked King Edward VII to preside over the tercentenary celebrations for the founding of Quebec City. Edward VII would accept the invitation on behalf of his son, George, Prince of Wales (later George V). The Prince of Wales arrived at Quebec City aboard the Royal Navy cruiser, . Unlike his earlier tour in 1901, his royal tour in 1908 was limited to the ceremony in Quebec City, as well as a military review of the Canadian militia on the Plains of Abraham.

1910s
Several members of the royal family toured Canada during the 1910s. In 1913, Prince Albert (later George VI) conducted his first royal tour of the Canada, as well as Newfoundland, while serving aboard the Royal Navy cruiser .

Prince Arthur as governor general
From 1911 to 1916, Prince Arthur, Duke of Connaught and Strathearn served as Canada's Governor General, with the Duchess of Connaught and Strathearn serving as his viceregal consort. The Duke was the first member of the royal family to serve the office of Governor General of Canada. Originally his appointment was for only two-years, although at the request of Robert Borden, the Prime Minister of Canada, his tenure would later be extended to five-years.  The Duke, Duchess, and their daughter, Princess Patricia of Connaught, arrived in Quebec City on 13 October 1911 and was later sworn into office at the Parliament of Quebec. Several weeks after being sworn in, he presided over the opening of the Parliament of Canada in Ottawa. 

The Duke and Duchess conducted his first tour as Governor General in 1911, proceeding to Toronto, Hamilton, Kingston, and finally Montreal on 27 November 1911. Further tours with the Duke, and Princess Patricia, were undertaken in May 1912, to Winnipeg, and the Maritimes.  On 28 August 1912, the Duke, Duchess, and their daughter conducted a tour of the west, visiting Sault Ste. Marie, Saskatoon, Prince Albert, Edmonton, Calgary, Banff, Vancouver, Prince Rupert, and Victoria, where they inspected personnel of the Royal Canadian Navy at Esquimalt Royal Navy Dockyard. They then proceeded towards Medicine Hat, Regina, and Brandon, before concluding their tour in Toronto and Ottawa.

While serving as the Governor General, the Duke inaugurated the Saskatchewan Legislative Building, and laid the cornerstone for the Cathedral of St. John the Evangelist in Regina, and for the new Provincial Library at the British Columbia Parliament Buildings. The Duke returned to Banff on two occasions, in August 1914, and May 1916.   In addition to Canada, he also visited Newfoundland, a separate dominion of the British Empire in 1914.

In January 1913, the Duchess was hospitalized as a result of her declining health, with the viceregal family returning to London, UK, in March 1913. During this period, the Duke, continuing to serve as Governor General, received regular correspondences from Borden through telegraph. After the Duchess recovered, the family returned to Canada in October 1913. During World War I, the Duke was involved in recruitment, and raising the morale of soldiers. Princess Patricia worked for the Canadian Red Cross, and continued working for a Canadian hospital in Orpington, UK, after her father's term as Governor General ended in 1916. Several months after Centre Block on Parliament Hill was ravaged by a fire, the Duke laid the memorial cornerstone for its replacement on 1 September 1916. The Duke's tenure as Governor General ended on 16 October 1916.

1919 royal tour

After the end of World War I in November 1918, Edward, Prince of Wales (later Edward VIII) set out to develop his role as the Prince of Wales through a tour of the Empire, with his first tour occurring in the dominions of Newfoundland and Canada in 1919. Organization for the tour was undertaken by Joseph Pope, the Assistant Clerk to the Privy Council for Canada. Unlike earlier tours, the 1919 royal tour dropped the rigid formalities of earlier tours, partly due to authorities' inability to control the crowds who came to see the Prince. The informality of the tour was matched by the Prince of Wales, whose informal dress, and mannerisms had struck the right note with Canadians.

Boarding  on 5 August 1919, Edward proceeded to St. John's, Newfoundland, then Saint John, Halifax and Charlottetown, before proceeding towards Quebec City on 21 August 1919. Proceeding towards Ontario, he laid the foundation stone of the Peace Tower on Parliament Hill, met with the League of Canadian Indians at Sault Ste. Marie, and took a three-day canoe trip down the Nipigon River to fish and hunt with two Ojibwa guides. On 26 August, he inaugurated Warriors' Day at the Canadian National Exhibition.

He then travelled to Regina, where he renamed a library the Prince of Wales Library. He then proceeded towards Vancouver, toured the area, attended a civic reception and military ball, as well as opening the New Westminster Exhibition. While in Alberta, he was named Chief Morning Star by the Chiefs of the Nakoda First Nations. The Prince also went on to Victoria, where he laid the foundation stone of a statue of Queen Victoria on the grounds of the British Columbia Parliament Buildings.

1920s and 1930s

In 1923, the Prince of Wales was in Canada on a visit, and work on his privately owned ranch, E. P. Ranch. Arriving at Quebec City on 12 September, he made stops in Ottawa and Winnipeg before reaching his private ranch near Calgary, known as E. P. Ranch. He made another private visit to his ranch in 1924, as well as touring as well various towns and cities; in the latter year, he stopped at Rideau Hall for various official functions and again frustrated his staff by disappearing for dancing and golf.

In 1926, the brother to the Prince of Wales, Prince George (later Duke of Kent), arrived in Canada and actively took part in squash, badminton, and tennis games played in Rideau Hall's Tent Room; the Governor General, The Marquess of Willingdon, said of the Prince: "Such a nice boy, but shy, & as mad ib exercise as the P. of W." Prince George, along with the Prince of Wales, conducted another royal tour of Canada in 1927. During the tour, the Prince of Wales and Prince George opened Union Station and the Princes' Gates in Toronto.

1939 royal tour

The 1939 royal tour of Canada was a cross-Canada royal tour by King George VI and Queen Elizabeth. It was one of the first visits of a reigning monarch to Canada (in 1926, Queen Marie of Romania also visited the country). This tour marked the first time that the sovereign's official Canadian birthday was marked with the monarch himself present in the country; the occasion was marked on Parliament Hill with a celebration and a Trooping of the Colour.

During another Canadian tour in 1985, Queen Elizabeth, then the Queen Mother, stated in a speech: "It is now some 46 years since I first came to this country with the King, in those anxious days shortly before the outbreak of the Second World War. I shall always look back upon that visit with feelings of affection and happiness. I think I lost my heart to Canada and Canadians, and my feelings have not changed with the passage of time."

1940s
Princess Alice, Countess of Athlone, resided in Canada from June 1940 to April 1946 as the viceregal consort of Canada; accompanying her spouse, Alexander, Earl of Athlone, who was sworn in as the Governor General of Canada on 21 June 1940.

Another royal relative, Alastair, Duke of Connaught and Strathearn, resided in Canada from 1940 as the aide-de-camp to the Governor General. On 23 April 1943, Alastair was found dead on the floor of his room at Rideau Hall. He had died from hypothermia. Newspapers at the time cited the cause of death as "natural causes."

In 1941, Prince George, Duke of Kent visited several Royal Canadian Air Force bases in Canada. In the same year, Edward, the Duke of Windsor (formerly Edward VIII) visited Canada to stay at his private ranch in Alberta. He entered Canada at North Portal, before proceeding towards Calgary the next day. As the visit was only few years removed from the 1936 abdication crisis, he was initially discouraged from visiting by the Canadian Prime Minister, William Lyon Mackenzie King. However, King would later send Edward a telegram welcoming him shortly after he entered the country. Edward departed Canada after spending nine days there, summoned back to the Bahamas as its governor, after a hurricane struck the islands. Edward would visit Canada on two more occasions, visiting New Brunswick in 1945, and Alberta in 1950. During his time in Alberta, Edward slept at the viceregal suite of the Palliser Hotel in Calgary; as the state of his ranch had deteriorated in the years since his last visit. In 1945, Edward sought the appointment as the Governor General of Canada, although failed to obtain it.

By 1945, Sir Alan Lascelles, the private secretary of George VI, and Sir Shuldham Redfern, Secretary to the Governor General of Canada, were discussing the idea of the King making regular flights to Canada to open parliament and perform other constitutional and ceremonial duties. The notion was eventually forgotten.

Late 20th century (1951–2000)

Elizabeth II
Elizabeth II conducted 20 official tours of Canada from 1951 to 2000. She first toured Canada in 1951, as Princess Elizabeth, Duchess of Edinburgh. In her subsequent tours of the country, she toured it as the Queen of Canada. In addition to official tours, in the 20th century, the Queen had made nine stopovers in Canada, in order to refuel the aircraft she was travelling on.

1950s

Princess Elizabeth, Duchess of Edinburgh, and her husband, the Duke of Edinburgh, made their first appearance in every Canadian province (including Newfoundland, the newest) in 1951, on behalf of her ailing father. 
In Toronto, she took in a Toronto Maple Leafs game at Maple Leaf Gardens and greeted Ontarians at numerous official functions. 
In New Brunswick the Princess and Duke arrived at Fredericton's Union Station on 6 November, greeted by both Lieutenant Governor David Laurence MacLaren and hundreds of well-wishers, and moved on to tour the University of New Brunswick, Christ Church Cathedral, and the Legislative Assembly Building. It was then on to Saint John, where the royal couple travelled in a motorcade watched by some 60,000 people, visited a veterans' hospital, and attended a civic dinner at the Admiral Beatty Hotel, where the silver flatware designed specifically for the 1939 visit of the King was used. After an overnight on the royal train, Princess Elizabeth and the Duke of Edinburgh made whistle-stops in Moncton and Sackville before departing the province. 
The National Film Board of Canada produced a documentary film Royal Journey, chronicling the 1951 royal tour.

In 1953 during a brief stop-over for refueling in Gander, Newfoundland, the Queen decided, after being roused from sleep at 3:20 am by their singing of "For She's a Jolly Good Fellow", to address the crowd gathered outside.

Elizabeth returned to Canada in 1957, there giving her first ever live television address, appointing her husband to her Canadian Privy Council at a meeting which she chaired, and on 14 October, opening the first session of the 23rd parliament. About 50,000 people descended on Parliament Hill to witness the arrival of the monarch. Due to the financial austerity of the times, the pageantry was muted in comparison to what would be seen at a similar event in the United Kingdom. June Callwood said in her coverage of the tour for Maclean's: "The Queen's role in Canada, it appeared to some observers, hinged on calculated pageantry, just enough to warm the pride of Canadians who revere tradition and stateliness above state but not so much as to antagonize those who consider royalty a blindingly off-colour bauble in an age of lean fear." In Saskatchewan, the Queen inaugurated the natural gas-fired Queen Elizabeth Power Station on the South Saskatchewan River.

Two years later, in 1959 the Queen returned and toured every province and territory of the country; Buckingham Palace officials and the Canadian government opted to dub this a "royal tour", as opposed to a "royal visit", to dispel any notion that the Queen was a visiting foreigner. Controversy arose in the run-up to the visit when CBC personality Joyce Davidson, while being interviewed by Dave Garroway on NBC's Today Show, said that as an "average Canadian" she was "pretty indifferent" to the Queen's forthcoming visit. Davidson was lambasted in the Canadian press and by many indignant Canadians for her comment. Regardless, the Queen toured the entire country, specifically directing that events she attended should be public, rather than closed luncheons or receptions; further, popular Canadian athletic stars were invited to royal events for the first time, so that during her tour the Queen met with Jean Béliveau, Sam Etcheverry, Maurice Richard, Punch Imlach, and Bud Grant.

One of the most important events of this trip was the official opening of the St. Lawrence Seaway, along with President Dwight D. Eisenhower, where, in Prescott, Ontario, the Queen made her first live appearance on Canadian television. During this tour, the Queen paid numerous visits to Canadian industries, and again made a visit to the United States as Canada's head of state, stopping in Chicago and Washington, D.C., with Diefenbaker as her attending minister. The Prime Minister insisted that the Queen be accompanied at all times by a Canadian Cabinet minister, being determined to make it clear to Americans that the Queen was visiting the United States as the Canadian monarch, and that "it is the Canadian embassy and not the British Embassy officials who are in charge" of the Queen's itinerary. Her speeches in Chicago, written by her Canadian ministers, stressed steadily the fact that she had come to call as Queen of Canada. In this vein, the Queen hosted the return dinner for Eisenhower at the Canadian Embassy in Washington.

The Queen returned to New Brunswick, at the end of her pan-Canada tour. The sovereign presided over a Queen's Scout recognition ceremony in Fredericton, visited the veterans' hospital in Lancaster, and undertook a walkabout in Victoria Park, Moncton. At Pointe-du-Chêne, the royal couple visited briefly with the families of fishermen who had died the previous month in a storm off Escuminac, making a donation to the New Brunswick Fisherman's Disaster Fund that was established in honour of the deceased.

Unknown to all involved, the Queen was pregnant with her third child. Prime Minister Diefenbaker urged her to cut the tour short after her disclosure to him at Kingston, Ontario, but the Queen swore him to secrecy and continued the journey, leaving the public announcement of the upcoming birth until she returned to London.

Once the news was released, criticism of the tour that had simmered during its progress unleashed in full: Diefenbaker was blamed for pushing the Queen to carry on a grueling continent-wide trip, and the brevity of stops necessary to complete such a journey, combined with the formality and inaccessibility of events, led to calls for a cease to that format of royal tour. The Albertan stated: "The fact is that royalty has no roots in Canada. And if roots must be put down, they certainly should be of a different kind than those which are historically proper for Britain." Prior to the tour, the President of the Saint-Jean-Baptiste Society, with the support of the Mayor of Quebec City, requested of the tour officials that, on the evening of Saint-Jean-Baptiste Day, Her Majesty light the main bonfire in celebration. Though the Queen did lay a wreath at the James Wolfe Monument on the Plains of Abraham, the Queen's Canadian Secretary at the time, Howard Graham, left the bonfire off the itinerary, leading to complaints.

Successes were also noted, especially in the Crown's assistance in entrenching the newly emerging Canadian identity; the Queen ensured that the Red Ensign (then Canada's de facto national flag) was flown on the royal yacht, and she stood to attention for the duration of each playing of "O Canada", the country's then still unofficial national anthem, sometimes even joining in the singing.

1960 to 2000

Queen Elizabeth II also celebrated the centennial of the Confederation Conferences in Charlottetown on 6 October 1964. On 10 October, as she was touring the streets of Quebec City, a turbulent riot occurred and opposed anti-monarchist Quebec nationalists with the police. Since then, the event has been known as Samedi de la matraque ("Truncheon Saturday").

In 1971, the Queen was in British Columbia to celebrate the centennial of the province's entry into Confederation. She toured Alberta and Saskatchewan in July 1973, to celebrate the centennial of the Royal Canadian Mounted Police, opening the new RCMP museum building in Regina, and in 1978, to open the Commonwealth Games in Edmonton. In Saskatchewan, she dedicated Queen Elizabeth Court, in front of Regina's city hall.

From 28 June to 6 July 1976, Prince Charles, Prince Andrew and Prince Edward joined the Queen and Prince Philip for the 1976 Olympic Games in Montreal. Princess Anne was a member of the British equestrian team competing in the Olympics in Montreal. The royal family also stopped by Nova Scotia and New Brunswick during the visit. The Queen arrived at Fredericton, New Brunswick, on 15 July, after which she travelled to Woolastook Provincial Park to visit the Boy Scout Jamboree campsite, picnicked with 3,500 schoolchildren, toured the Kings Landing Historical Settlement, and attended a provincial dinner with fireworks following. The Queen's second day in New Brunswick brought her to the Miramichi area, where she attended a provincial lunch, visited Chatham and Newcastle, and toured the Burchill Laminating Plant in Nelson-Miramichi.

The Queen also journeyed to New Brunswick to celebrate the province's bicentennial in 1984, touching down, along with Prince Philip, at Moncton airport on 24 September, from where the royal party travelled to Shediac, Sackville, Riverview, and Fredericton over the course of three days. While at the Legislative Building, the Queen issued a Royal Warrant augmenting the province's coat of arms with its present crest, supporters, compartment, motto. She also, when in Fredericton, unveiled a plaque in Wilmot Park that honoured Edward Wilmot and recounted the dedication of the park by the Queen's great-grandfather.

The Queen undertook a royal tour of Canada from 30 June 1992 to 3 July 1992 in order to preside over commemorations for the 125th anniversary of Canadian Confederation and her ruby jubilee. On 30 June, she unveiled an equestrian statue of herself at Parliament Hill in Ottawa. The statue is placed across a statue of Queen Victoria, the first monarch of a confederated Canada. On the same day, the Queen also unveiled two stained-glass windows at Rideau Hall, one to commemorate her ruby jubilee, the other to commemorate the 40th anniversary of the appointment of the first Canadian-born governor general of Canada. The following day, she presided over the swearing in of new members for the Queen's Privy Council of Canada, before presiding over official Canada Day celebrations on Parliament Hill.

The Queen opened the University of Northern British Columbia in 1994.

Philip, Duke of Edinburgh

Philip, Duke of Edinburgh, consort to Queen Elizabeth II, participated in a number of official tours of Canada during his lifetime, with his first tour occurring in 1951, accompanying his spouse, Princess Elizabeth. He made more than 70 visits to Canada, including 20 royal tours with Queen Elizabeth II.  He travelled to Canada on his own on 46 occasions, typically as a private working tour where he served as a patron for awards and events such as the Commonwealth Study Conference and the Duke of Edinburgh Awards.

The Duke of Edinburgh visited Canada on two occasions to open two multi-sport event, the 1954 British Empire and Commonwealth Games, and the 1967 Pan American Games. The trip was one of many visits to Canada the Duke made without the Queen. Other visits without the Queen occurred in 1960, 1962, 1978, 1979, 1980, and 1998, as he was chairing the Commonwealth Study Conference, hosted in Canada during those years. He also made 11 trips to Canada in relation to The Duke of Edinburgh's Award. The Duke also made several visits relating to his role with the Armed Forces. He was appointed the colonel-in-chief of the Royal Canadian Regiment on 8 December 1953 and presented the 3rd Battalion's first colours on Parliament Hill in 1973.

Charles, Prince of Wales
Charles, Prince of Wales (later Charles III) made 12 official tours of Canada from 1970 to 2000. His first official tour of Canada was in July 1970, touring Ottawa, prior to joining The Queen, the Duke of Edinburgh, and Princess Anne's official tour of Manitoba, to celebrate of the centennial of Manitoba's entry into Confederation.

The Prince and his first wife, the Princess of Wales attended the bicentennial in 1983 of the arrival of the first Empire Loyalists in Nova Scotia, and also visited Newfoundland to mark the 400th anniversary of the island becoming a British colony. In 1986, the Prince and Princess of Wales toured British Columbia, visiting Vancouver to open Expo 86 (on 2 May 1986), as well as Victoria, Prince George, Kamloops and Nanaimo.

In 1991, the Prince and Princess of Wales toured Ontario; in Toronto, the princess was joined on board the Royal Yacht Britannia by her two sons, Princes William and Harry, and caused some controversy when she broke from established protocol by enthusiastically hugging the two boys after they ran up the gangplank to meet her. After performing official duties in the city, including a formal dinner at the Royal York hotel, the royal family then went on to visit Sudbury, Kingston, Ottawa, and Niagara Falls, where the princes, as their great-great-great-grandfather had done, rode on Maid of the Mist.

Other royal family members

Queen Elizabeth The Queen Mother, queen consort to King George VI, and mother of Elizabeth II, conducted nine official tours of Canada from 1951 to 2000. In 1967, she returned to Nova Scotia and Prince Edward Island to celebrate Canada's centennial in 1967. On a visit in 1985 to Toronto and Saskatchewan she noted, "It is now some 46 years since I first came to this country with the King, in those anxious days shortly before the outbreak of the Second World War. I shall always look back upon that visit with feelings of affection and happiness. I think I lost my heart to Canada and Canadians, and my feelings have not changed with the passage of time." In addition to her nine official tours, she conducted one private working tour in 1965, touring Toronto to celebrate the 50th anniversary of the Toronto Scottish Regiment, a regiment where she holds the position of colonel-in-chief.

Elizabeth II's sister, Princess Margaret, Countess of Snowdon, conducted seven official tours of Canada, as well as three private working tours of Canada from 1951 to 2000 Two of her private working tours were conducted in relation to her role as patron of the Princess Margaret Hospital. Official tours include tours of Nova Scotia and British Columbia in 1958. In BC, the princess opened the new floating bridge in Kelowna, with two plaques marking the ceremony. She also presided over the celebrations of the 75th anniversary of Saskatchewan's entry into Confederation.

Princess Alexandra, The Honourable Lady Ogilvy, conducted three official tours of Canada, as well as four private working tours of the country from 1951 to 2000.

Anne, Princess Royal, conducted over six official tours of Canada, as well as seven private working tours from 1951 to 2000. Princess Anne presided over the 1970 celebrations of the centennial of Manitoba's entry into Confederation alongside her brother, the Prince of Wales.

Prince Andrew, Duke of York, conducted five official tours of Canada, as well as 10 private working tours from 1951 to 2000. His first official tour was conducted in 1976, whereas his first private working tour was conducted in the following year, after attending a semester of secondary school at Lakefield College School, in Selwyn, Ontario. He undertook his first official tour of Nova Scotia in 1985, during which, amongst other activities, he visited Halifax and skippered Bluenose II.

Other members of the royal family that conducted either official, or private working tours of Canada in the second half of the 20th century include Princess Marina, Duchess of Kent, Princess Alice, Duchess of Gloucester, Mary, Princess Royal, Prince Edward, Duke of Kent, Katharine, Duchess of Kent, the Prince and Princess Michael of Kent, and the Earl and Countess of Wessex.

21st century

Elizabeth II

Elizabeth II conducted three official tours of Canada in the 21st century. In 2002, Elizabeth II toured the Canadian provinces of British Columbia, New Brunswick, Manitoba, Ontario, Quebec, and the territory of Nunavut, for her Golden Jubilee.

In 2005, the Queen was in Alberta again to mark the province's 100th birthday, where she attended, along with an audience of 25,000, a kick-off concert at Commonwealth Stadium, re-designated the Provincial Museum of Alberta as the Royal Alberta Museum, and addressed the Legislative Assembly, becoming the first reigning monarch to do so. The Alberta Ministry of Learning encouraged teachers to focus education on the monarchy and to organize field trips for their students to see the Queen and her consort, or to watch the events on television. In Saskatchewan, the Queen presided over the main events for the centennial of Saskatchewan's creation, as well as touring the Canadian Light Source Synchrotron and the University of Saskatchewan, where, in the Diefenbaker Canada Centre, is stored correspondence between former Prime Minister John Diefenbaker and the Queen.

In 2010, Elizabeth II visited Ontario and Manitoba. Arriving in Ottawa 30 June, she toured the Canadian Museum of Nature and met with Prime Minister Stephen Harper. The following day, the Queen and the Duke of Edinburgh joined the festivities for Canada Day on Parliament Hill. The royal tour ended as the Queen and the Duke of Edinburgh departed for New York on 6 July, following visits to Toronto and Waterloo.

Charles III
Since 2001, Charles, Prince of Wales (later King Charles III), has conducted five official tours in Canada as the Prince of Wales; in April 2001, November 2009, May 2012, May 2014, and June–July 2017. He was accompanied by his spouse, Camilla, Duchess of Cornwall on the latter four tours.

In 2001 he toured through Ottawa, where his interactions with the crowds kept Prime Minister Jean Chrétien waiting for twenty minutes. He also toured Regina, Moose Jaw, Assiniboia, Saskatoon, Whitehorse, and Mayo. In Saskatchewan, he turned the sod for the Prince of Wales Cultural and Recreation Centre in Assiniboia and dedicated the Anniversary Arch outside Regina's YMCA. Charles and Camilla visited New Brunswick, Ontario, and Saskatchewan from 20–23 May 2012 during the year of the Queen's Diamond Jubilee. In 2017, the Prince of Wales and Duchess of Cornwall were in Canada from 29 June to 1 July for Canada Day celebration and for the country's sesquicentennial celebrations. Charles and Camilla again visited Canada in May 2022, during the year of the Queen's Platinum Jubilee. A theme of their 3-day visit was reconciliation with the indigenous peoples of Canada, which Charles framed as a "vital process".

William, Prince of Wales

William, Duke of Cambridge has conducted two official tours in Canada in the 21st century. The 2011 royal tour of Canada was the first time Prince William, and Catherine, Duchess of Cambridge, visited Canada as the Duke and Duchess of Cambridge. The tour saw the newlywed couple tour Ottawa, Montreal, Quebec City, Charlottetown, Summerside, Yellowknife, Calgary, as well as the fire-ravaged community of Slave Lake. It was the first such tour undertaken by the Duke and Duchess since their marriage two months prior.

In 2016, the Duke and Duchess of Cambridge, along with their children, Prince George of Cambridge, and Princess Charlotte of Cambridge, conducted an official tour of British Columbia and Yukon, visiting Victoria, Vancouver, Bella Bella, Kelowna, Whitehorse, Carcross, and Haida Gwaii.

Anne, Princess Royal
Anne, Princess Royal has conducted seven private working tours, and one official working tour of Canada since 2001. She conducted private working tours in August–September 2003, June 2004, June 2007, February 2010, April 2010, October 2013, and February 2015; and one official tour in November 2014.

The Princess Royal's private tours to Canada are typically conducted in association with her honorary role as the colonel in chief of six units in the Canadian Forces. In April 2010, she visited St. John's to celebrate the anniversary of the Royal Newfoundland Regiment, as well as Regina, to celebrate its centennial. The Princess Royal also a visit to Barrie on 22 October 2013 to commemorate the opening of park with military significance and to visit the Grey and Simcoe Foresters, for which she their current colonel-in-chief.

The Princess Royal and her husband Vice-Admiral Tim Laurence arrived in Canada on 10 November 2014 in Ottawa for a two-day official tour, with focus on Remembrance Day ceremonies in Ottawa, such as the re-dedication of the National War Memorial.

Edward, Earl of Wessex

Since 2001, Prince Edward, Earl of Wessex, has conducted 17 private working tours in Canada. His first visit to Canada in the 21st century occurred in October 2001, with his latest tour occurring in October–November 2015. Most of these visits were conducted for ceremonies relating to the Duke of Edinburgh Award.

In 2003, Prince Edward opened two parks in Saskatchewan, the Prince Edward Park in Melfort and the Queen's Golden Jubilee Rose Garden in Moose Jaw. In 2005, the Earl and Countess of Wessex toured Ontario; the Earl visited Peterborough, Prince Edward County, and Toronto, while his spouse, Sophie, Countess of Wessex, went to Welland to be installed as Colonel-in-Chief of the Lincoln and Welland Regiment.

The Countess has accompanied her husband, Prince Edward on a number of tours to Canada. Their tour of Canada in 2002 marked the Countess' first tour outside of the United Kingdom. In 2009, the Countess of Wessex opened the Air Force Museum of Alberta in Calgary, spending some hours visiting its displays. The Countess of Wessex has also conducted private working tours of her own, as was the case in November 2015.

Other royal family members

In the 21st century, Prince Philip has conducted three official tours alongside Queen Elizabeth, in October 2002, May 2005, and June 2010. In addition to official tours, he has conducted three private working tours, in October 2001, April 2004, and April 2013. In 2001, he visited Toronto in order to present the Duke of Edinburgh Award to recipients, and participate in activities relating to the World Wildlife Foundation. In April 2013, David Johnston, the Governor General of Canada, presented Philip with the Order of Military Merit, and inducted him as a Companion of the Order of Canada. On 27 April 2013, Prince Philip, the Colonel-in-Chief of the Royal Canadian Regiment, visited Toronto in order to present the 3rd battalion its second colours.

Prince Andrew, Duke of York, has conducted 17 of private working tours in Canada since 2001. His first tour in the 21st century was in January 2001, whereas his latest tour in Canada occurred in May 2019. In 2003, he came twice, at one point going into the field in full combat uniform to observe tactical exercises and address the troops of the Queen's York Rangers, of which he is colonel-in-chief.

Princess Alexandra, The Honourable Lady Ogilvy, has conducted two private working tours of Canada, in April 2010, and October 2012. During her 2010, she visited Toronto and Victoria to attend the 150th anniversary ceremonies for the establishment of The Queen's Own Rifles of Canada, of which she is the colonel-in-chief. In 2012, she returned to Victoria to attend the 100th anniversary for The Canadian Scottish Regiment (Princess Mary's).

Since 2001, Prince Harry, Duke of Sussex, has visited Canada on two private working tours, on 26 June 2007, and from September–October 2008. Both visits were conducted for military exercises at CFB Suffield in Alberta. In addition to private working tours, Harry has made informal visits to the country, such as the opening for the 2017 Invictus Games in Toronto. It was during these games that Prince Harry, and his future spouse, Meghan, Duchess of Sussex made their first public appearance together. Prior to their first public appearance, reports had surfaced in 2016 that Harry visited Meghan at her home in Toronto; who was residing in the city from 2011 to 2017 in order to film the television series Suits.

See also
List of royal tours of Canada (18th–20th centuries)
List of royal tours of Canada (21st century)
List of royal visits to Hamilton, Ontario
List of royal visits to London, Ontario
Royal visits to Saskatchewan
Royal and viceroyal transport in Canada
Royal Canadian Air Force VIP aircraft

References

Further reading

External links

  - Government of Canada
 Royal Family - National Film Board of Canada
 The Monarchy - CBC Digital Archive
 The Royal Presence in Canada - A Historical Overview

Elizabeth II
Monarchy in Canada